Off Our Backs (stylized in all lowercase; oob) was an American radical feminist periodical that ran from 1970 to 2008. It began publishing on February 27, 1970, with a twelve-page tabloid first issue. From 2002 the editors adapted it into a bimonthly journal.

Off Our Backs was edited and published by a collective of women who practiced consensus decision-making. Marilyn Salzman Webb, Heidi Steffens, Marlene Wicks, Colette Reid, and Norma Lesser formed the original Off Our Backs collective. The staff later consisted of Carol Anne Douglas, Tacie Dejanikus, Amaya Roberson, Sherri Whatley, Laura Butterbaugh, Farar Elliott, Angie Manzano, Karla Mantilla, Jennie Ruby, Jenn Smith, Alice Henry, and Angie Young.

Off Our Backs was last published in 2008 due to financial trouble.

The editorial statement from the first issue in February 1970 states that Off Our Backs "is a paper for all women who are fighting for the liberation of their lives and we hope it will grow and expand to meet the needs of women from all backgrounds and classes." The editors ask readers to "use this paper to relate what you are doing and what you are thinking, for we are convinced that a woman speaking from the agony of her own struggle has a voice that can touch the experience of all women."

Archives of Off Our Backs are housed at Hornbake Library, University of Maryland.

The title of the magazine On Our Backs (one of the first women-run erotica magazines and one of the first magazines to feature lesbian erotica for a lesbian audience in the United States) was a satirical reference to Off Our Backs, which the founders of On Our Backs considered prudish about sexuality. Off Our Backs regarded the new magazine as "pseudo-feminist" and threatened legal action over the logo OOB.

See also
 List of lesbian periodicals

References

Bimonthly magazines published in the United States
LGBT-related magazines published in the United States
Defunct women's magazines published in the United States
English-language magazines
Feminism in Washington, D.C.
Feminist magazines
Lesbian culture in Washington, D.C.
Lesbian feminist literature
Magazines established in 1970
Magazines disestablished in 2008
Magazines published in Washington, D.C.
Radical feminist literature
Women's studies journals
1970 establishments in the United States